Marianne Van Brussel is a Paralympian athlete from Belgium competing mainly in category F10-11 throwing events.

Marianne competed in the 1996 Summer Paralympics in all three throws winning a gold medal in the F10-11 javelin competition.

External links
 profile on paralympic.org

Paralympic athletes of Belgium
Athletes (track and field) at the 1996 Summer Paralympics
Paralympic gold medalists for Belgium
Living people
Medalists at the 1996 Summer Paralympics
Year of birth missing (living people)
Place of birth missing (living people)
Paralympic medalists in athletics (track and field)
Belgian female javelin throwers
Visually impaired javelin throwers
Paralympic javelin throwers